Eirwyn George (born 1936 in Tufton, Pembrokeshire) is a Welsh poet. He won the crown of the National Eisteddfod of Wales in 1982 and 1993, earning him the title of Prifardd.

References 

1936 births
Living people
Welsh poets
Crowned bards